Puerto Rico competed at the 1960 Summer Olympics in Rome, Italy. 27 competitors, 26 men and 1 woman, took part in 13 events in 6 sports.

Athletics

Men's Pole Vault
Rolando Cruz

Basketball

Fencing

One female fencer represented Puerto Rico in 1960.

Women's foil
 Gloria Colón

Shooting

Four shooters represented Puerto Rico in 1960.

25 m pistol
 Leon Lyon

50 m pistol
 Miguel Barasorda
 Fred Guillermety

Trap
 Xavier Zequeira

Swimming

Weightlifting

References

External links
Official Olympic Reports

Nations at the 1960 Summer Olympics
1960
1960 in Puerto Rican sports